The Chapel of Saint Brigid is an 11th-century chapel overlooking the town of Fosses-la-Ville, province of Namur, Belgium. This large and ancient chapel is placed under the protection of Saint Brigid, an Irish nun.

References

Sources
RTBF.be: Fosses la ville: la restauration de Sainte-Brigide assure la transmission du savoir-faire des tailleurs de pierre, 18 May 2022
Diocese of Namur: A Fosses-la-Ville, la statue de sainte Brigide passe de ferme en ferme, 5 May 2020
LeSoir.be: Fosses-la-Ville; Un folklore celtique remontant au VII esiècle. Les pèlerins apprêtent leurs baguettes, Luc Scharès, 5 May 2001 
Atelier-arc.eu: Chapelle Sainte-Brigide (Namur)
LaNouvelleGazette-sambre-meuse.sudinfo.be: 360.000 euros pour la restauration globale de la chapelle Sainte-Brigide à Fosses, 7 December 2021

Churches in Namur (province)
Roman Catholic chapels in Belgium